James Allen Cottrell (born January 13, 1983) is a former American football linebacker. He was originally signed by the Baltimore Ravens as an undrafted free agent in 2006. He played college football at New Mexico State.

Early life
Born the son of Jim Cottrell and Tammi Hausmen Jimmy attended and played at Douglas County High School in Castle Rock, Colorado. Jimmy was named to the All-State and All-Colorado teams by both the Rocky Mtn. News and the Denver Post, as well as Conference Defensive MVP his senior season. He was named 1st Team All-Conference at linebacker during his Junior and Senior seasons, as well as 2nd Team All-Conference running back as a senior. Jimmy also wrestled for the Huskies, earning All-Conference honors as a Junior and Senior, and placed in the state tournament as a senior. Jimmy also earned a letter in baseball during his high school sports career.

College career
Jimmy played college football at New Mexico State University where he became the only player in school history to lead the team in tackles for 4 years. Jimmy started 45 of 46 games at middle linebacker for the Aggies during his college career. He racked up 463 total tackles, which places him 3rd all-time in school history, and he led the team in tackles all 4 of his playing seasons. Jimmy lead the nation in tackles as a senior with 179 total stops. Jimmy was named Honorable Mention All-Sun Belt Conference as a sophomore, 1st Team All-Sun Belt Conference as Junior, and 1st Team All-Western Athletic Conference as a senior, as well as being named Honorable Mention All-American as a senior.

Professional career
Jimmy Cottrell signed as a free agent with the Baltimore Ravens in 2006, and spent the 2006 NFL season on the Raven's practice squad. Following the 2006 season he was allocated to the Frankfurt Galaxy of NFL Europe during the spring of 2007. During the 2007 NFL Europe season he suffered a serious shoulder injury. Jimmy spent all of the 2007 NFL season on the Baltimore Raven's Injured Reserve.

Kiowa Schools
From 2019 to 2021 Jimmy served as the Athletic Director and a Football Coach for Kiowa Schools, in his most recent season the Kiowa Indians went 1-3 for the season because of Covid.

External links
Baltimore Ravens bio

1983 births
Living people
People from Castle Rock, Colorado
American football linebackers
New Mexico State Aggies football players
Baltimore Ravens players
Frankfurt Galaxy players